Factfinder may refer to:

Trier of fact, a legal position.
American FactFinder, a data retrieval product of the U.S. Census Bureau.